The 1947 Wilberforce State Green Wave football team was an American football team that represented Wilberforce State College of Education (now known as Central State University) in the Midwest Athletic Association (MAA) during the 1947 college football season. In its 12th season under head coach Gaston F. Lewis, the team compiled a 11–1 record and all outscored opponents by a total of 415 to 79.

Wilberforce State was ranked No. 2 among the nation's black college football teams according to the Pittsburgh Courier and its Dickinson Rating System.  The team's only defeat was against Tennessee A&I, the team selected by the Courier as the 1947 national champion.

Key players on the 1947 Wilberforce State team included halfbacks Walt Sellers and Carl Baylor, quarterbacks Freddie Hall and Michael "Mickey" Carter, and end Blake White.

Prior to the start of the 1947–48 academic year, the State of Ohio withdrew support from the church-supported portion of the school. The two portions of the school then split and fielded separate football teams with different coaches. Lewis, who had been the coach at Wilberforce since 1934, took responsibility for coaching the state school, and Dwight Fisher coached the religious school.

Schedule

References

Wilberforce State
Central State Marauders football seasons
Wilberforce State Green Wave football